Arthur Saunders Gore, 3rd Earl of Arran (20 July 1761 – 20 January 1837), styled Viscount Sudley from 1773 to 1809, was an Irish peer and Tory Member of Parliament.

Life
Arran was the eldest son of Arthur Saunders Gore, 2nd Earl of Arran, by his first wife the Hon. Catherine Annesley. In 1783, he was elected to the Irish House of Commons for Baltimore and Donegal Borough. He chose to sit for the first and represented the constituency until 1790. In 1800, he was returned for Donegal County until the Union with Great Britain took place at the end of the year. Subsequently, he sat then for County Donegal in the House of Commons of the United Kingdom to 1806. In 1809 he succeeded his father as third Earl of Arran, but as this was an Irish peerage it did not entitle him to a seat in the House of Lords of the United Kingdom.

Lord Arran married Mary Tyrell, daughter of Sir John Tyrell, 5th Baronet, in 1787. They had no children. He died in January 1837, aged 75, and was succeeded in his titles by his nephew Philip.

References
Kidd, Charles, Williamson, David (editors). Debrett's Peerage and Baronetage (1990 edition). New York: St Martin's Press, 1990.

1761 births
1837 deaths
Irish MPs 1783–1790
Irish MPs 1798–1800
Members of the Parliament of the United Kingdom for County Donegal constituencies (1801–1922)
UK MPs 1801–1802
UK MPs 1802–1806
UK MPs who inherited peerages
Arthur
Members of the Parliament of Ireland (pre-1801) for County Donegal constituencies
Members of the Parliament of Ireland (pre-1801) for County Cork constituencies
Earls of Arran (Ireland)